Bolshoy Dvor is a rural locality (a village) in Baydarovskoye Rural Settlement, Nikolsky District, Vologda Oblast, Russia. The population was 60 as of 2002.

Geography 
The distance to Nikolsk is 23 km, to Baydarovo is 3 km. Solotnovo is the nearest rural locality.

References 

Rural localities in Nikolsky District, Vologda Oblast